Rachael Battersby is a Paralympic medalist from New Zealand who competed in alpine skiing.  She competed in the 2002 Winter Paralympics where she won three gold medals in Slalom LW6/8, Giant Slalom LW6/8, and Downhill LW3,4,6/8,9.

References

External links 
 
 

Alpine skiers at the 2002 Winter Paralympics
Paralympic gold medalists for New Zealand
Living people
New Zealand female alpine skiers
Year of birth missing (living people)
Medalists at the 2002 Winter Paralympics
Paralympic medalists in alpine skiing
Paralympic alpine skiers of New Zealand
21st-century New Zealand women